The Le Corse class (or E50 Type) was a class of 4 fast frigates (Escorteurs Rapide) built for the French Navy in the early 1950s. They were first surface combatant class of ships to be built after World War II and symbolized "the revival of the French fleet."  They were followed by the  Le Normand-class (or E52 Type) frigates, and like them, were long-range convoy escorts capable of high speed.

The E50 type shared a flush-decked layout with the E52 class, and had a similar armament of three twin 57mm turrets) (one forward and two aft) and an anti-submarine armament consisting of a battery of heavyweight guided torpedoes and a 375mm Bofors six-barrel rocket launcher.

Ships

See also
List of Escorteurs of the French Navy

References

External links
 Description générale des escorteurs 

Frigate classes
Cold War frigates of France
Ship classes of the French Navy